Volodymyr is a Ukrainian male name.

Volodymyr may also refer to:

 Volodymyr (city), Volyn Oblast, Ukraine
 Volodymyr (novel), a 1962 historical novel by Ukrainian writer Semen Skiarenko
 Volodymyrska Street, a street in Kyiv, Ukraine

See also 
 Vladimir (disambiguation)